Miguel Bandarra Rodrigues (born 17 January 1996) is a Portuguese professional footballer who plays for S.C. Farense as a defender.

Football career
He made his Taça da Liga debut for Farense on 27 July 2019 in a game against Académica.

References

External links

1996 births
Living people
People from Vila Real de Santo António
Portuguese footballers
Association football defenders
Primeira Liga players
Liga Portugal 2 players
Campeonato de Portugal (league) players
Lusitano F.C. (Portugal) players
Juventude de Pedras Salgadas players
Louletano D.C. players
C.F. Os Armacenenses players
Casa Pia A.C. players
S.C. Farense players
Sportspeople from Faro District